Rawal (IAST: Rāvala) is an Indian community from Rajasthan and Gujarat. They are known as priests of devi temples and perform a form of dance known as Rammat during the worship. They were well respected and patronised by the Charans.

Origin 
Rawals claim to be converted from Brahmins around the 12th century.

History 
In the past, Rawals would wander from village to village to present night-long Rammat performances in the temples.

Rammat of Rawal 
Rawals are known for their performances called Rammat, which are devotional in nature dedicated to their patron goddess. It begins with a prayer to the goddess after which the performing arena is marked with a sword. This Rammat tradition is thought to be ‘almost extinct’ in modern times.

Mahendra Bhanawat in the study of folk theatre traditions of Rajasthan, states about the origin of Ramat:“Rawals of Rajasthan who visit their distinguished clients (Charan Yajamans) for gifts (virats) would impersonate in various disguises (Swangs) and perform various acts of entertainments-called Ramats. I was told on enquiry that the Rawals, in earlier times, would impersonate the goddesses they worshipped during Navaratras and would sing devotional songs (Charjayen) to the accompaniment of mridanga, taal and rawaj etc. With the passage of time, they started playing kheras in front of Charans also and presented different impersonations(swangs). For a Khera performance, a boy would dress up like the goddess and another boy in his female garb would present various Charjas throughout the night laced with songs, dance and drums. These devotional performances came to be known as Ramats.”

Genealogists 
Rawals are one of the castes who perform as genealogists for the Charans.

Modern occupations 
Presently, Rawals are mainly engaged in cultivation and in the weaving of coarse cotton cloth and tapes.

Population 
According to the 1961 Census, the Rawal population in Rajasthan was approximately 4,500.

Further reading 

 Rājasthāna ke Rāvala By Devilal Samar · 1967

See also 
Motisar

References 

Indian castes
Charan
Social groups of Gujarat